Welch Commercial Historic District is a national historic district  located at Welch, McDowell County, West Virginia.  The district includes 56 contributing buildings and one contributing structure in Welch's central business district. It includes a variety of retail stores, banks and offices, with some having apartment rental on their top floors. Also on the district is a municipal parking garage built in 1941. Notable buildings include The Liberty Building (c. 1925), the Flat Iron Building (c. 1915), Bablis Building (c. 1925), former City Hall (c. 1925), Odd Fellows Temple (1929), Carter Hotel-Tyson Tower Building (1924), Wyoming-Elkhorn Apartment Building (c. 1920), McDowell County National Bank (1900), and McDowell County Courthouse Annex Building (1935).

The McDowell County Courthouse, built in 1893 and expanded in 1909, on the north side of Wyoming Street in Welch, was listed on the National Register in 1979. The district starts across Wyoming Street and runs west to the Tug Fork (aka Tug River) and south to Elkhorn Creek, covering the main commercial area of the town.

It was listed on the National Register of Historic Places in 1992, and its boundaries were increased in 2018.

It includes the Flat Iron Building, at 73 McDowell, which was built by Green & Stowe Co.  around 1915.  It is a three-story two-part commercial block building, for retail space on ground floor and offices above. It is a red brick building with an irregular roof plan and with a detailed stone and brick cornice in stone and brick. Its first story is covered with Carrara glass.  In 2022, the first floor retail space was occupied by the Flat Iron Drug Store.

References

External links

National Register of Historic Places in McDowell County, West Virginia
Historic districts on the National Register of Historic Places in West Virginia